Parsnip Swamp is a swamp in the U.S. state of Washington.

Parsnip Swamp was so named on account of parsnip-like plants growing in it.

References

Bodies of water of Thurston County, Washington
Swamps of the United States